Björn Schlicke (born 23 June 1981) is a German retired footballer who played as a defender.

Schlicke began his career at SpVgg Greuther Fürth and had spells at Hamburger SV, 1. FC Köln and MSV Duisburg, and FSV Frankfurt before returning to Greuther Fürth to play for the club's reserves.

Honours
Hamburger SV
DFL-Ligapokal: 2003

References

1981 births
Living people
Association football defenders
German footballers
SpVgg Greuther Fürth players
Hamburger SV players
Hamburger SV II players
1. FC Köln players
1. FC Köln II players
MSV Duisburg players
FSV Frankfurt players
SpVgg Greuther Fürth II players
Bundesliga players
2. Bundesliga players
Germany B international footballers
Germany under-21 international footballers
Sportspeople from Erlangen
Footballers from Bavaria